MLPS may refer to:

Martin Luther Preparatory School, a school located in Prairie du Chien, Wisconsin, from 1979 to 1995
Minneapolis, Minnesota, correctly abbreviated as MPLS